Giacomo Accarisi (1599-1653) was a Roman Catholic prelate who served as Bishop of Vieste (1644–1654).

Biography
Giacomo Accarisi was born in 1599.
On 17 October 1644, he was appointed during the papacy of Pope Innocent X as Bishop of Vieste.
On 13 November 1644, he was consecrated bishop by Cesare Facchinetti, Bishop of Senigallia, with Patrizio Donati, Bishop of Minori, and Bartolomeo Vannini, Bishop of Nepi e Sutri, serving as co-consecrators.
He served as Bishop of Vieste until his death in 1654.

He taught rhetoric in Modena in 1627, and is remembered for publishing arguments against Galileo's notions that the earth orbits the sun.

Episcopal succession
While bishop, he was the principal co-consecrator of:
Ascanio Maffei, Archbishop of Urbino (1646); 
Mario Montani, Bishop of Nocera Umbra (1646); and 
Marco Romano (bishop) (Marco Cristalli), Bishop of Ruvo (1646).

References

External links and additional sources

 (for Chronology of Bishops) 
 (for Chronology of Bishops)  

17th-century Italian Roman Catholic bishops
Bishops appointed by Pope Innocent X
1654 deaths
1599 births